Jeffrey W. Coy  (October 6, 1951 – June 4, 2018) was an American politician who was a member of the Pennsylvania Gaming Control Board and a former Democratic member of the Pennsylvania House of Representatives.

He is a 1969 graduate of Shippensburg Area Senior High School. He earned a degree from Shippensburg University in 1973. He serves as a director for the Shippensburg-based Orrstown Bank.

Coy was first elected to represent the 89th legislative district in the Pennsylvania House of Representatives in 1982. He served as Democratic (Majority) Caucus Chairman from 1993 through 94 as the majority party. In 1995, he was elected to serve as Democratic (Minority) Caucus Secretary. He was re-elected 11 times in a heavily Republican district.

Coy announced his intention not to seek re-election in early 2004. In August, Coy was nominated by the House Democratic leader Bill DeWeese to become a member of the Pennsylvania Gaming Control Board, a controversial nomination because of a provision of the Pennsylvania Constitution prohibiting legislators from serving on such boards "during the time for which he was elected". Senate Republicans interpreted the phrase to mean the entire two-year legislative term, which would expire on November 30, 2004, and suggested that the Democrats appoint a placeholder until the end of the legislative term. Coy's resignation from his seat would satisfy the constitution. Coy resigned his legislative seat effective September 2, 2004 and was appointed to the Pennsylvania Gaming Control Board effective the next day.

Coy died on June 4, 2018, aged 66.

References

External links
Pennsylvania Gaming Control Board - Jeffrey W. Coy, Commissioner - PGCB profile
 official PA House profile (archived)
 official Party website

1951 births
2018 deaths
Democratic Party members of the Pennsylvania House of Representatives
Shippensburg University of Pennsylvania alumni
People from Chambersburg, Pennsylvania
People from Shippensburg, Pennsylvania
Members of American gaming commissions
Gambling in Pennsylvania